Alenka Bernot is a former slalom canoeist who competed for Yugoslavia in the early-to-mid 1960s. She won a gold medal in the mixed C-2 event at the 1963 ICF Canoe Slalom World Championships in Spittal.

References
ICF medalists for Olympic and World Championships - Part 2: rest of flatwater (now sprint) and remaining canoeing disciplines: 1936-2007.

Possibly living people
Year of birth missing (living people)
Yugoslav female canoeists
Medalists at the ICF Canoe Slalom World Championships